Chaetopsis duplicata is a species of ulidiid or picture-winged fly in the genus Chaetopsis of the family Ulidiidae.

References

duplicata
Insects described in 1921